Morgan Kelly (born 23 June, 1976) is a Canadian actor, best known for his roles on Being Erica and Killjoys.

Career
Kelly is known for his role on Fries with That? as Alexander "Alex" Kurzi. He also appears on Falcon Beach as Lane Bradshaw, a juvenile delinquent and as "Skinny" briefly on Degrassi: The Next Generation. He also played a small part in the film A History of Violence as a friend to the bully who picks on Jack Stall. He played a recurring role in the series Being Erica, and also made a one-episode appearances on Flashpoint, Alphas, and Beauty & the Beast before playing a recurring character on Killjoys.

Filmography

Film

Television

References

External links
 
 
 

1976 births
Living people
Male actors from Montreal
Canadian male television actors
Canadian male film actors